Moronts is an unincorporated community in Putnam County, Illinois, United States, located approximately  northeast of Hennepin. There was never a town, only a train station and a grain elevator.

References

Unincorporated communities in Putnam County, Illinois
Unincorporated communities in Illinois